Alice Louise Walton (born October 7, 1949) is an American heiress to the fortune of Walmart. As of October 2022, Walton has a net worth of $59 billion, making her the 19th-richest person, and the second richest woman in the world according to Bloomberg Billionaires Index.

Early life and education
Walton was born in Newport, Arkansas. She was raised along with her three brothers in Bentonville, Arkansas and graduated from Bentonville High School in 1966. She graduated from Trinity University in San Antonio, Texas, with a B.A. in economics.

Career
Early in her career, Walton was an equity analyst and money manager for First Commerce Corporation and headed investment activities at Arvest Bank Group. She was also a broker for EF Hutton. In 1988, Walton founded Llama Company, an investment bank, where she was president, chairwoman and CEO.

Walton was the first person to chair the Northwest Arkansas Council and played a major role in the development of the Northwest Arkansas Regional Airport, which opened in 1998. At the time, the business and civic leaders of Northwest Arkansas Council found a need for the $109 million regional airport in their corner of the state. Walton provided $15 million in initial funding for construction. Her company, Llama Company, underwrote a $79.5 million bond. The Northwest Arkansas Regional Airport Authority recognized Walton's contributions to the creation of the airport and named the terminal the Alice L. Walton Terminal Building. She was inducted into the Arkansas Aviation Hall of Fame in 2001.

In the late 1990s, Llama Co. closed, and in 1998, Walton moved to a ranch in Millsap, Texas, named Walton's Rocking W Ranch. An avid horse-lover, she was known for having an eye for determining which 2-month-olds would grow to be champion cutters. Walton listed the farm for sale in 2015 and moved to Fort Worth, Texas, citing the need to focus on the Crystal Bridges Museum of American Art.

In his 1992 autobiography Made in America, Sam Walton remarked that Alice was "the most like me—a maverick—but even more volatile than I am."

Art
Walton and her mother would often paint watercolors on camping trips.  The first piece of art Walton purchased was a print of Picasso's Blue Nude when she was ten years old; it cost her 5 weeks allowance. Her first museum quality artwork purchase was of two Winslow Homer watercolors in the late 1980s. 

In December 2004, Walton purchased art sold from the collection of Daniel and Rita Fraad at Sotheby's, in New York. In 2005, Walton purchased Asher Brown Durand's celebrated painting, Kindred Spirits, in a sealed-bid auction for a purported US$35 million. The 1849 painting, a tribute to Hudson River School painter Thomas Cole, had been given to the New York Public Library in 1904 by Julia Bryant, the daughter of Romantic poet and New York newspaper publisher William Cullen Bryant, who is depicted in the painting with Cole. She has also purchased works by American painters Winslow Homer and Edward Hopper, as well as a notable portrait of George Washington by Charles Willson Peale, in preparation for the opening of Crystal Bridges. In 2009, Walton acquired Norman Rockwell's "Rosie the Riveter" for $4.9 million.

Walton's attempt to quit smoking inspired her to purchase a painting reminiscent of an earlier painting by John Singer Sargent by Alfred Maurer which depicts a full-length woman smoking. Another painting, by Tom Wesselmann, titled "Smoker #9" depicts a hyper realistic, disembodied hand and mouth smoking a cigarette.

In a 2011 interview, she spoke about acquiring great works by other artists, including Marsden Hartley and Andrew Wyeth, saying that she loved the emotion and spirituality they expressed. Other artists whose work Walton has purchased include Georgia O'Keeffe, Mark Rothko, Edward Hopper, Kehinde Wiley, and  Titus Kaphar.

Walton's interest in art led to the Walton Family Foundation developing the Crystal Bridges Museum of American Art in Bentonville, Arkansas. The architect Moshe Safdie designed the 200,000 square foot museum, which was built on 120 acres of Walton family land. Crystal Bridges opened in 2011 and has been visited more than 5 million times as of 2021. Walton says her motivation for the museum was to give access to art to people who had never had it.

Political contributions
Alice Walton was the 20th-largest individual contributor to 527 committees in the U.S. presidential election 2004, donating US$2.6 million to the conservative Progress for America group. As of January 2012, Walton had contributed $200,000 to Restore Our Future, the super PAC associated with Mitt Romney's presidential campaign. Alice donated $353,400 to the Hillary Victory Fund, a joint fundraising committee supporting Clinton and other Democrats, in 2016.

Philanthropy
In 2016, Walton donated $225 million among a total $407 million from Walmart heirs to the Walton Family Holdings Trust, which finances the family's philanthropy.

Walton formed the Alice L. Walton Foundation in 2017. The foundation promotes arts, education, health, and improving economic opportunity. In 2020, the foundation gave the University of Central Arkansas $3 million in funding for its fine arts program. That year, the foundation also gave a $1.28 million grant to the University of Arkansas for Medical Sciences to expand its program to provide healthy food in schools. In 2022, Walton's foundation gave a $3.5 million grant to the Northwest Arkansas Food Bank: $3 million to support construction of a food distribution center, and $500,000 to buy and distribute food.  

Also in 2017, Walton formed the Art Bridges foundation. It partners with small and regional museums with less access to cultural resources. The foundation provides funding, collection loans and traveling exhibits, and creates art programs with museums. Walton has said her goal is to reduce the amount of art kept in storage. As of September 2021, the foundation had approximately 30 exhibits traveling throughout the United States. The Arts Bridges Fellows Program provides opportunities for people from historically underrepresented groups to work with its museum partners. Additionally, Walton has given $10 million to the Crystal Bridges Museum of American Art, and partnered with the Ford Foundation through Art Bridges to fund programs to improve diversity in arts leadership.

Healthcare

In 2019, Walton established the Whole Health Institute. The institute works with health systems, employers and communities to build and expand access to holistic healthcare. In March 2021, Walton announced that the institute would build a nonprofit medical school in Bentonville called the Alice L. Walton School of Medicine. The school will focus on allopathic medicine and graduates will receive a doctor of medicine degree. The campus will be located near Crystal Bridges. Construction is expected to begin in 2023, with the first class enrolling in 2025, pending accreditation. 

In 2021, the Alice L. Walton Foundation partnered with the Cleveland Clinic to evaluate health care in Northwest Arkansas. Following that evaluation, in 2022, the foundation and Washington Regional Medical System announced plans to create a nonprofit medical system aimed at training doctors in specialty care fields such as oncology, cardiology, and neurology.

Personal life
Walton married a prominent Louisiana investment banker in 1974 at age 24, but they were divorced two and a half years later. According to Forbes, she married "the contractor who built her swimming pool" soon after, "but they, too, divorced quickly".

Walton has been involved in multiple automobile accidents, one of them fatal. She lost control of a rented Jeep during a 1983 Thanksgiving family reunion near Acapulco and plunged into a ravine, shattering her leg. She was airlifted out of Mexico and underwent more than two dozen surgeries; she suffers lingering pain from her injuries. In April 1989, she struck and killed 50-year-old Oleta Hardin, who had stepped onto a road in Fayetteville, Arkansas. In 1998, she hit a gas meter while driving under the influence of alcohol. She paid a $925 fine.

References

External links
 Forbes The World's Billionaires: Alice Walton , 2007
 Forbes The 400 Richest Americans: Alice Walton, 2007
 Alice Walton's contributions to Crystal Bridges Museum

1949 births
Living people
American art collectors
American billionaires
American businesspeople in retailing
EF Hutton people
Female billionaires
Trinity University (Texas) alumni
People from Newport, Arkansas
Alice